Noah's Arc: Jumping the Broom, is a 2008 American romantic comedy-drama film based on the LOGO television series Noah's Arc. It was released on October 24, 2008 in select theaters and video on demand. The film is MPAA rated R in the U.S. for "sexual content and language."

Synopsis
Noah Nicholson (Darryl Stephens) and his ARC: Alex Kirby (Rodney Chester), Ricky Davis (Christian Vincent), and Chance Counter (Doug Spearman), retreat to Martha's Vineyard for Noah's intimate marriage to Wade Robinson (Jensen Atwood). While Alex's hubby, Trey (Gregory Kieth), video chats from home to babysit their newly adopted Ethiopian child, Chance brings his husband, Eddie (Jonathan Julian). Ricky is accompanied by the 19-year old Brandon (Gary LeRoi Gray), who is also Chance's student, for some lighthearted fling-dating. As the four couples hole up and attend separate bachelor parties, each relationship begins to unravel. Chance and his husband deal with unsettled problems within their marriage. Alex's energy pill-popping throughout the weekend, coupled with surprise drop-ins from Noah's boss Brandy (Jennia Fredrique) and rapper Baby Gat (Jason Steed), who is still interested in being in a relationship, does not help Noah and Wade work through last-minute jitters.

Cast
 Darryl Stephens as Noah Nicholson
 Christian Vincent as Ricky Davis
 Doug Spearman as Chance Counter
 Rodney Chester as Alex Kirby
 Jensen Atwood as Wade Robinson
 Jonathan Julian as Eddie McEntire
 Jason Steed as Baby Gat
 Tonya Pinkins as Mrs. Robinson
 Gary LeRoi Gray as Brandon
 Phoebe Snow as Herself
 Jennia Fredrique as Brandy King

Production
According to creator Patrik-Ian Polk, who produced and directed the film and co-wrote with fellow series writer John R. Gordon, the feature film version of the series, Jumping the Broom, picks up after the series' second season cliffhanger finale and centers around the Martha's Vineyard wedding of the series' lead character Noah and his boyfriend Wade. The film was shot in Nova Scotia.

Release
The film had a limited release in theaters located in Los Angeles, New York City, Atlanta, Chicago, Palm Springs, and Washington, D.C. On November 7, the film was released in Ocean City, New Jersey, Detroit, and San Francisco; and November 28 in Philadelphia and Dallas.

Critical response
Although much lauded in the gay press, Jumping the Broom has been met with generally mixed reception elsewhere. Time Out called it "ludicrous", whilst Variety described it as "a lame feature". Several critics felt that the leap from cable to big screen was too great. The film  holds a 42% rating on Rotten Tomatoes.

Box office
The film surprised the entertainment industry by opening at number 1 on the independent film box office report, according to IndieWire (October 27, 2008). Theaters reported multiple sold-out screenings days in advance of the release and most added additional screenings to accommodate the overwhelming fan response. In fact, the film had an opening weekend per screen average of $30,336 and narrowly came second for top per screen average by the Clint Eastwood/Angelina Jolie film Changeling, which opened in limited release the same weekend and averaged $32,601. Theaters playing the film opening weekend reported by mid-December it had taken just over $532,000 at the US box office despite the film receiving little to no mainstream marketing support and never played on more than 7 screens at once during its 7-week theatrical run. By the end of its run, the film had grossed a domestic total of $532,878.

Accolades
The film received three NAACP Image Award nominations: Outstanding Independent Feature Film, Outstanding Writing in a Feature Film, and Outstanding Directing in a Feature Film. The film was also nominated for GLAAD Award's for Best Feature Film (Limited Release), in which it won.

Soundtrack

The soundtrack was released on October 21, 2008 by Tommy Boy Records and features Michelle Williams, Bob Sinclar, Roy Young, and Phoebe Snow.

Home media
The film was released February 3, 2009 on DVD.

References

External links
 
 
 
 

2008 films
2008 romantic comedy-drama films
Canadian romantic comedy-drama films
American LGBT-related television films
American romantic comedy-drama films
2000s English-language films
Films based on television series
Films set in Massachusetts
Canadian independent films
African-American LGBT-related films
African-American films
Same-sex marriage in film
Films shot in Nova Scotia
Films directed by Patrik-Ian Polk
American independent films
LGBT-related romantic comedy-drama films
Canadian LGBT-related television films
Black Canadian films
American drama television films
American comedy television films
Canadian drama television films
Canadian comedy television films
2000s American films
2000s Canadian films